Ficus amazonica is a species of flowering plant in the family Moraceae. It is found in Brazil, Guyana, Trinidad and Tobago, and Venezuela.

References

amazonica
Least concern plants
Taxonomy articles created by Polbot
Taxa named by Friedrich Anton Wilhelm Miquel
Taxa named by Édouard André